Balidaan may refer to:

 Balidaan (1971 film), a 1971 Bollywood drama film
 Balidaan (1985 film), a 1985 Bollywood action film
 Balidaan (1997 film), a 1997 Nepali historical-drama film